The Kosovar records in swimming are the fastest ever performances of swimmers from Kosovo, which are recognised and ratified by the Kosovo Swimming Federation (FNK).

All records were set in finals unless noted otherwise.

Long Course (50 m)

Men

Women

Short Course (25 m)

Men

Women

References

Kosovo
Swimming in Kosovo
Swimming
Swimming